The 1971 Bingöl earthquake was a  6.6 earthquake that occurred at  on 22 May. It had a surface-wave magnitude of 6.9 and a maximum intensity of VIII (Severe) on the Mercalli intensity scale, killing 755–1,000 people.

Tectonic setting

Most of Turkey lies on the Anatolian Plate. Deformation from is accommodated through three main faults: the eastern portion of the Hellenic Trench accommodates convergence between the Aegean Sea Plate and the Anatolian Plate in the south, the North Anatolian Fault in the north accommodates the collision between the Arabian Plate and the Eurasian Plate which forces the Anatolian west, and the East Anatolian Fault in the east, on which this earthquake occurred, accommodates the same deformation.

Earthquake
The  6.6 earthquake struck near the city of Bingöl, Turkey at 18:44 local time. The depth it struck at varies depending on the agency, but it is agreed to be very shallow. The focal mechanism was likely strike-slip as this earthquake occurred on the East Anatolian Fault. There were two magnitude 5.1 aftershocks on the day of the mainshock. The mainshock ruptured along a  ×  area of the East Anatolian Fault. A second rupture area measuring  ×  was detected to the northeast.

Damage
The earthquake killed at least 755 people and injured 1,200 more. In Bingöl, 90 percent of buildings were destroyed, including the prison and hospital. It caused a total of $5 million USD in damage.

See also 
 List of earthquakes in 1971
 List of earthquakes in Turkey

References

Further reading
Seymen, İ. & Aydın, A. (1972). The Bingöl earthquake fault and its relation to the North Anatolian Fault Zone. Bulletin of the Mineral Research and Exploration, 79 (79), 1–12.

External links

1971 Bingöl
1971 earthquakes
1971 in Turkey
History of Bingöl Province
May 1971 events in Asia
1971 disasters in Turkey